William Garland Dailey (born May 13, 1935) is an American former Major League Baseball relief pitcher who played in all or part of four seasons for the Cleveland Indians from 1961 to 1962 and the Minnesota Twins from 1963 to 1964. He was born in Arlington, Virginia.

Dailey spent almost nine full years in minor league baseball before his recall by the Indians in August 1961. In Dailey's one full Major League season— with the Twins—he appeared in 66 games (second among American League pitchers), compiling a 6–3 record and a 1.99 earned run average. His 21 saves ranked third in the league that season.

In 119 career MLB games pitched, all in relief, Dailey posted a 10–7 won–lost record, 22 saves, and a 2.76 earned run average. In 185 innings pitched, he struck out 109, allowing 162 hits and 59 bases on balls.

References

External links

1935 births
Living people
Atlanta Crackers players
Baseball players from Virginia
Cleveland Indians players
Fargo-Moorhead Twins players
Keokuk Kernels players
Major League Baseball pitchers
Minnesota Twins players
Mobile Bears players
Sacramento Solons players
Salt Lake City Bees players
San Diego Padres (minor league) players
Sherbrooke Indians players
Sportspeople from Arlington County, Virginia